Ramón Xirau Subías (20 January 1924 – 26 July 2017) was a Spanish-born Mexican poet, philosopher and literary critic.

In 1939, as the Spanish civil war was coming to an end, Xirau emigrated to Mexico where he obtained Mexican citizenship in 1955. He obtained a Master's Degree in philosophy at the UNAM and an honorary doctorate from the Universidad de las Américas. He was a research faculty member of the UNAM y and the National System of Researchers. At the UNAM he taught at the Faculty of Philosophy and Literature and did research at the Institute of Philosophy Research. He was a member of the Colegio Nacional since 1973.

Xirau received the Legion of Honour from France and the Isabel la Católica from Spain awards as well as the Creu de Sant Jordi from the Generalitat of Catalonia for his works in essay and academics in Spanish and Catalan literature. He also received the Elías Sourasky and the Premio Universidad Nacional awards at the UNAM. Professor Xirau is mostly known in the English speaking world as the co-author of The Nature of Man along with Erich Fromm (Macmillan 1968).

Other selected works
 Palabra y Silencio, Siglo XXI (1968) 
 Tiempo Vivido: Acerca de Estar, Siglo XXI (1985)  
 Entre la Poesía y el Conocimiento: Antología de Ensayos Críticos Sobre Poetas y Poesía Iberoamericanos, Fondo de Cultura Económica (2004)  
 Introducción a la Historia de la Filsofía, UNAM (2009) 
 Genio y Figura de Sor Juana Inés de la Cruz (Tercera edición),El Colegio Nacional (2019)

References 

1924 births
2017 deaths
Philosophers from Catalonia
Spanish philosophers
Mexican philosophers
Poets from Catalonia
Spanish poets
Mexican male poets
Mexican male writers
Members of El Colegio Nacional (Mexico)
Spanish literary critics
Mexican people of Catalan descent
Academic staff of the National Autonomous University of Mexico
Writers from Barcelona
Spanish emigrants to Mexico